The Shock Value II Tour was a 2010 concert tour by American rapper/producer, Timbaland to support his third studio album, Shock Value II (2009). The tour lasted from January 15, 2010 to February 3, 2010.

Set list

"Timothy Where You Been" 
"Say Something" 
"Give It Up to Me" / "Give It to Me"
"The Way I Are" 
"Morning After Dark" 
"Oh Timbaland"
"Long Way Down" 
"Can You Feel It" 
"If We Ever Meet Again" 
"Carry Out" 
"Lose Control" 
"Tomorrow in the Bottle" 
"Promiscuous" / "Say It Right" / "SexyBack" / "My Love"

Tour dates

External links
 Tour dates

Timbaland